The electoral district of North Launceston, sometimes referred to as Launceston North, was an electoral district of the Tasmanian House of Assembly. It was based in  Tasmania's second city, Launceston, and the surrounding rural area.

The seat was created as a single-member seat ahead of the 1871 election following the dissolution of the multi-member Launceston seat. In 1886, it became a two-member seat, and at the 1897 election, it was abolished when the Launceston seat was recreated under a trial of the Hare-Clark model.

The seat was then recreated as a single-member seat at the 1903 election and was abolished when the Tasmanian parliament adopted the Hare-Clark electoral model for the entire state in 1909.

Members for North Launceston
Single member: 1871–1886

Two member: 1886–1897

Second incarnation: 1903–1909

References
 
 
 Parliament of Tasmania (2006). The Parliament of Tasmania from 1956

Launceston North